Ida Boy-Ed (17 April 1852 – 13 May 1928) was a German writer. A supporter of women's issues, she wrote widely-read books and newspaper articles.

Early years
Ida Cornelia Ernestina Ed was born in Bergedorf in 1852 to a supportive family who encouraged her to write. Her father had started his own newspaper business. Her creation of short novels and other literary works was deterred when she married Carl Johann Boy at the age of seventeen.

Career

Over her husband's objections in 1878, she moved out of the house she shared with his family. She took her eldest son, Karl, with her to Berlin where she intended to make her living by writing. Despite already being a published author of serialised novels and having experience in newspaper writing, she did not find success with the pieces she wrote at this time. She did, however, use her money to assist other artists. In 1880, she was obliged to move back to Lübeck at her husband's insistence as their divorce was not finalized.

Boy-Ed spent much of her spare time writing while raising her children, but did not become successful until the age of 30. A book of her novellas about the Hanseatic middle classes was the first of about 70 that she published. Boy-Ed studied and wrote about leading German women like Charlotte von Stein, Charlotte von Kalb and the French writer Germaine de Staël. Like them, she tried to support women's issues in her writings although her principal reason for writing was to make money. She achieved a wide readership for her books, as well as the hundreds of newspaper articles that she wrote. Boy-Ed invested in an impressive apartment and was a patron of the arts.

In September 1914, at the outset of the First World War, Boy-Ed's son Walther was killed in France. Undeterred, Boy-Ed wrote of the need for a mother's sacrifice. She published her ideas in 1915 under the title Soldiers' Mothers in which she makes it clear, "A mother is only dust on the road to victory".  Boy-Ed's son, Karl, was the naval attaché of the German Embassy at Washington. His younger brother Emil was also a naval officer. Karl recalled that Thomas Mann was amongst the many literary and musical people who visited his mother's home. Boy-Ed died in 1928 in Travemünde and was buried in Lübeck.

Selected works

 Ein Tropfen,  1882
 Die Unversuchten,  1886
 Dornenkronen,  1886
 Ich,  1888
 Fanny Förster, 1889
 Nicht im Geleise,  1890
 Ein Kind',  1892
 Empor!,  1892
 Werde zum Weib,  1894
 Sturm,  1894
 Die säende Hand,  1902
 Das ABC des Lebens,  1903
 Heimkehrfieber. Roman aus dem Marineoffiziersleben,  1904
 Die Ketten,  1904
 Der Festungsgarten,  1905
 Ein Echo,  1908
 Nichts über mich!,  1910
 Ein königlicher Kaufmann, Hanseatischer Roman,  1910
 Hardy von Arnbergs Leidensgang,  1911.
 Ein Augenblick im Paradies,  1912
 Charlotte von Kalb. Eine psychologische Studie,  1912
 Eine Frau wie Du!  1913
 Stille Helden,  1914
 Vor der Ehe,  1915
 Die Glücklichen  1916 (?)
 Das Martyrium der Charlotte von Stein. Versuch ihrer Rechtfertigung, 1916
 Die Opferschale,  1916
 Nur wer die Sehnsucht kennt...,  1916
 Erschlossene Pforten,  1917
 Um ein Weib,  1920
 Aus Tantalus Geschlecht,  1920
 Glanz,  1920
 Germaine von Stael. Ein Buch anläßlich ihrer...,  1921
 Brosamen,  1922
 Fast ein Adler,  1922
 Annas Ehe,  1923
 Das Eine,  1924
 Die Flucht,  ca. 1925
 Gestern und morgen,  1926
 Aus alten und neuen Tagen,  1926

 References 

Bibliography
 
 Dreyer, Elsa: Unvergessene Frauen (…) Ida Boy-Ed in Lichtwark Nr. 9, August 1949, Hrsg.: Lichtwark-Ausschuß, Bergedorf. Siehe jetzt: Verlag HB-Werbung, Hamburg-Bergedorf. 
 Mann, Thomas: Briefe an Otto Grautoff (1894–1901) und Ida Boy-Ed (1903–1928), Hrsg.: Peter de Mendelssohn, Fischer, Frankfurt am Main 1975
  Saxe, Cornelia: Ida Boy-Ed. In: Britta Jürgs (Hg.): Denn da ist nichts mehr, wie es die Natur gewollt. Portraits von Künstlerinnen und Schriftstellerinnen um 1900. AvivA Verlag, Berlin, 2001, ; S.193-215
  Wagner-Zereini, Gabriele: Die Frau am Fenster. Zur Entwicklung einer weiblichen Schreibweise am Beispiel der Lübecker Schriftstellerin Ida Boy-Ed (1852–1928)''. Dissertation Univ. Frankfurt/M. 1999

External links
 
 
 

1852 births
1928 deaths
19th-century German women writers
People from Bergedorf
German patrons of the arts
19th-century German writers
20th-century German writers
20th-century German women writers